William W. Menasco is a topologist and a professor at the University at Buffalo.  He is best known for his work in knot theory.

Biography
Menasco received his B.A. from the University of California, Los Angeles in 1975, and his Ph.D. from the University of California, Berkeley in 1981, where his advisor was Robion Kirby. He served as assistant professor at Rutgers University from 1981 to 1984. He then taught as a visiting professor at the University at Buffalo where he became an assistant professor in 1985, an associate professor in 1991. In 1994 he became a professor at the University at Buffalo where he currently serves.

Work
Menasco proved that a link with an alternating diagram, such as an alternating link, will be non-split if and only if the diagram is connected.

References

Topologists
Living people
Year of birth missing (living people)
University at Buffalo faculty